Dave Turcotte (born May 21, 1983) is a Canadian politician in the province of Quebec. Turcotte was elected to represent the riding of Saint-Jean in the National Assembly of Quebec in the 2008 provincial election. He is a member of the Parti Québécois.

Born in Longueuil, Quebec, Turcotte graduated from the Université de Montréal with a bachelor's degree in communications and politics and is owner of a communications agency. He was also an assistant to Saint-Jean MP Claude Bachand of the Bloc Québécois.

Turcotte defeated Lucille Méthé of the ADQ in the 2008 elections.

External links
 
 Parti Québécois biopage 

1983 births
French Quebecers
Living people
Parti Québécois MNAs
People from Longueuil
Université de Montréal alumni
21st-century Canadian politicians